Androstane is a C19 steroidal hydrocarbon with a gonane core. Androstane can exist as either of two isomers, known as 5α-androstane and 5β-androstane.

Pharmacology
5α-Androstane is reported to be effective as an androgen, in spite of having no oxygen containing functional groups.

See also
 Estrane and pregnane
 List of androstanes
 C19H32

References

Androgens and anabolic steroids
Androstanes